The Wexford Junior Hurling Championship (known for sponsorship reasons as the Permanent TSB Junior Hurling Championship) is an annual hurling competition contested by lower-tier Wexford GAA clubs. The Wexford County Board of the Gaelic Athletic Association has organised it since 1903.

The all-time record-holders are Ferns St Aidan's, who have won the competition five times.

Horeswood are the title holders (2021) defeating Kilmore in the Final.

History

The Wexford Junior Hurling Championship dates back to 1903. It was the second championship to be established in Wexford following the Wexford Senior Hurling Championship in 1889.

No competition was held in 1906 or in 1915. There was also no competition between 1917 and 1923. No competition was held in 1925 either.

Rathnure defeated Rapparees by 1-15 to 1-06 in the 2018 championship decider replay.

Format
The series of games are played during the summer and autumn months with the county final currently being played in October. The championship features a group stage before the top-ranking teams complete a knock-out series of games.

Twelve clubs currently participate in the Wexford Junior Championship.

Honours
The Wexford Junior Championship is an integral part of the wider Leinster Junior Club Hurling Championship. The winners of the Wexford county final join the champions of the other hurling counties to contest the provincial championship. They often do well there with the likes of Fethard St Mogues among the clubs from Wexford to win at least one Leinster Championship after winning the Wexford Junior Hurling Championship.

List of finals

Wins listed by club

Multiple titles
 Ferns St Aidan's (5): 1912, 1932, 1952, 1956, 1958

 Buffers Alley (4): 1905, 1928, 1951, 1982

 Cloughbawn (4): 1935, 1946, 1972, 1980

 Blackwater (4): 1936, 1957, 1975, 2001

 Adamstown (4): 1926, 1929, 1970, 2010

 St Fintan's (3): 1939, 1944, 1978

 Rathnure (3): 1940, 1981, 1983

 St Martin's (3): 1948, 1963, 2002

 Shelmaliers (3): 1954, 1966, 1988

 St Anne's (3): 1924, 1977, 1996

 Davidstown–Courtnacuddy (3): 1961, 1990, 2007

 Ballymurin (2): 1908, 1916

 Rapparees (2): 1913, 1993

 Caim 	(2): 1927, 1941

 O'Hanrahans, New Ross (2): 1931, 1937

 St Mary's, Rosslare (2): 1934, 1999

 Camross (2): 1942, 1949

 Faythe Harriers (2): 1953, 1989

 Shamrocks (2): 1959, 1985

 Our Lady's Island (2): 1962, 2006

 Ballyhogue (2): 1965, 1971

 Askamore (2): 1969, 2000

 St Patrick's (2): 1991, 1994

 Oulart–The Ballagh (2): 1967, 2005

 Clongeen (2): 1986, 2008

 Craanford St Brendan's (2): 1968, 2009

Clubs with one title
 Rathgarogue (1): 1903

 Oulart (1): 1904

 Wolfe Tones, Gorey (1): 1907

 Glenbrien (1): 1909

 New Ross (1): 1910

 Davidstown (1): 1911

 Crossabeg (1): 1914

 Glynn (1): 1930

 Ballingale (1): 1933

 Starlights (1): 1938

 Oylegate (1): 1943

 St Aidan's, Enniscorthy (1): 1945

 Horeswood (1): 1947

 Insurgents, New Ross (1): 1950

 Oylegate–Glenbrien (1): 1955

 Hollow Rangers (1): 1960

 Liam Mellows (1): 1964

 Marshalstown (1): 1973

 Monageer–Boolavogue (1): 1974

 Glynn–Barntown (1): 1976

 Rathgarogue–Cushinstown (1): 1979

 Clonee (1): 1984

 Taghmon-Camross (1): 1987

 Fethard (1): 1992

 Geraldine O'Hanrahans (1): 1995

 Gusserane (1): 1997

 Ballyfad 	(1): 1998

 Bannow–Ballymitty (1): 2003

 Ballygarrett-Réalt-na-Mara (1): 2004

References

External links

Wexford Junior Hurling Championship roll of honour
Where the titles have gone: full Junior 'B' roll of honour published for first time

1
Junior hurling county championships
Wexford GAA club championships